Paulo Vladimir Brichta (born 22 March 1976) is a Brazilian actor.

Biography 
Paulo Vladimir Brichta was born in Diamantina, Minas Gerais but despite being born in Minas Gerais, he considers himself "an authentic Bahian", since he moved with his family to Bahia state at the age of four, after spending a season in Germany, where his father, Arno Brichta, has a PhD in Geology.

He loved the scenarios produced in the German school, and back to Salvador, Bahia, he enrolled in a school in the Bahia capital at the age of six, where he began to be part of the amateur theater group of the experimental school Hilda Figueiredo.

Personal life 
He currently lives with his wife, actress Adriana Esteves, with their son, Vicente, his daughter Agnes and Felipe, the son of Adriana's first marriage, with Brazilian actor Marco Ricca.

Filmography

Television

Film

References

External links
 

1976 births
Living people
People from Diamantina
Brazilian people of Czech descent
Brazilian male telenovela actors
Brazilian male film actors
People from Salvador, Bahia